Paulina Mikuła (born 30 June 1988 in Tomaszów Lubelski) is a Polish television presenter, Internet personality, and popularizer of Polish language knowledge.

Education and early career
She graduated in Polish studies from Warsaw University. In 2013, she created the vlog channel Mówiąc Inaczej (in cooperation with LifeTube), where she explains how to speak Polish in line with its standard language norms. In 2016, Mikuła wrote the usage guide Mówiąc inaczej published by Flow Books. In 2019, her YouTube channel reached over 435,000 subscribers.

Television career
At the end of 2016, Mikuła with Anna Gacek hosted the first edition of the program Bake Off - Ale ciacho on TVP2.

Influence
It is said that the main consequence of her activity is the growing number of young people who show interest in the Polish language and its prescribed norms, and their higher willingness to work and develop their way of speaking Polish.

Awards and nominations

Individual

Mówiąc Inaczej

References

External links
  

1988 births
Living people
Polish YouTubers
People from Tomaszów Lubelski